Oceania is, like other regions, quite diverse in its laws regarding homosexuality. This ranges from significant rights granted to the LGBT community in New Zealand, Australia, Guam, Hawaii, Easter Island, Northern Mariana Islands, Wallis and Futuna, New Caledonia, French Polynesia and  Pitcairn Islands to remaining criminal penalties for homosexual activity in 6 countries and one territory. Although acceptance is growing across the Pacific, violence and social stigma remain issues for LGBTI communities. This also leads to problems with healthcare, including access to HIV treatment in countries such as Papua New Guinea and the Solomon Islands where homosexuality is criminalised.

The United Kingdom introduced conservative social attitudes and anti-LGBT laws throughout the British Empire, including its colonies throughout the Pacific Ocean. This legacy persists in anti-LGBT laws found in a majority of countries in the subsequent Commonwealth of Nations. Opponents of LGBT rights in Oceania have justified their stance by arguing it is supported by tradition and that homosexuality is a "Western vice", despite anti-LGBT laws themselves being a colonial British legacy. Several Pacific countries have ancient traditions predating colonisation that reflect a unique local perspective of sexuality and gender, such as the fa'afafine in Samoa and fakaleiti in Tonga.

See also

Recognition of same-sex unions in Oceania
Australian Marriage Law Postal Survey
LGBT rights by country or territory
LGBT rights in Europe
LGBT rights in the Americas
LGBT rights in Asia
LGBT rights in Africa

References